Branch Area Careers Center is a public school offering Career and Technical Training for High School students in Coldwater Michigan the county seat of Branch County.  It is an extension of Coldwater, Bronson, Quincy, Union City, and Colon High Schools. As well as Pansophia and CASL Academy's. Branch Area Careers Center offers programs not offered in traditional schools.  The facility has been running continuously since it was dedicated in 1974, helping thousands of students graduate with a head start in their field of study.

Facility
The school is housed in a  building on Morse Street in Coldwater Michigan. It was built at a cost of 2.8 million dollars or $30 per square foot. A county wide millage was approved by voters in 1971 to pay for the original facility and operating costs every year after.

Courses offered
Agriculture, Food & Natural Resources
Autobody and Custom Paint
Automotive Technologies
Business Management, Marketing, & Technology
Cad-Cam Engineering & Architecture
Computer and Networking (IT)
Construction Trades
Criminal Justice / Law Enforcement
Culinary Arts
Education Professionals
Electrical & Automation Engineering Technology
Health Science
Welding Engineering Technologies

Participating Schools
Bronson High School
Coldwater High School
Quincy High School
Pansophia Academy
Union City High School
Colon High School
CASL Academy

Organizations
Students at the Branch Area Career Center belong to several organizations based on their course study.  Each organization offers competitions and activities these competitions happen on several different levels including local, regional, state and national.  
These organizations include:
BPA
DECA
 HOSA
Skills USA
FCCLA

References

External links
 Branch Area Career Center official site
Bronson High School official site
Coldwater High School official site
Quincy High School official site
Pansophia Academy official site
City of Coldwater
Branch County

Schools in Branch County, Michigan
Public high schools in Michigan
1974 establishments in Michigan
Educational institutions established in 1974
Coldwater, Michigan